The 1982 Junior Pot Black was the second staging of the junior snooker tournament which was held in the Pebble Mill Studios in Birmingham. 8 young players were competing in a knockout format reduced from 12 from 1981. The matches are one-frame shoot-outs and a 2 frame aggregate score in the final.

Broadcasts were on BBC2 and started at 19:00 on Monday 23 August 1982 running 7 shows in 10 days. Alan Weeks presented the programme with Ted Lowe as commentator and John Williams as referee.

As the previous year's champion Dean Reynolds turned professional, The only players from the last series competing this year were John Parrott, Neal Foulds, John Keers and Jonathan White and Parrott and Keers met in the final which Parrott won 169–70.

Main draw

References

Pot Black
Snooker competitions in England
1982 in snooker
1982 in English sport